Nguyễn Thành Chung (born 8 September 1997) is a Vietnamese professional footballer who plays as a centre-back for V.League 1 club Hà Nội and the Vietnam national team.

International career

Vietnam

Vietnam U-23

Honours
Hà Nội
V.League 1: 2016, 2018, 2019, 2022
Vietnamese National Cup: 2019, 2020, 2022
Vietnamese Super Cup: 2019, 2020, 2021
Vietnam U23 
AFC U-23 Asian Cup runners-up: 2018 
Southeast Asian Games: 2019
Vietnam
AFF Championship runners-up: 2022
VFF Cup: 2022

References 

1997 births
Living people
Vietnamese footballers
Association football midfielders
V.League 1 players
Hanoi FC players
People from Tuyên Quang province
Vietnam international footballers
2019 AFC Asian Cup players
Competitors at the 2019 Southeast Asian Games
Southeast Asian Games medalists in football
Southeast Asian Games gold medalists for Vietnam